The Keeper of Zoology was a zoological academic position within the Natural History Museum in London, England. The Keeper of Zoology acted as the head of the Department of Zoology. The following is a list of those who have held this position, which existed until 2013 when the Department of Zoology was merged with the departments of Entomology and Botany to form the Department of Life Sciences. Dates are those in office.

John George Children 1837–1840
John Edward Gray 1840–1875
Albert Karl Ludwig Gotthilf Günther 1875–1895
William Henry Flower 1895–1898
Edwin Ray Lankester 1898–1907
Sidney Frederic Harmer 1909–1921
Charles Tate Regan 1921–1927
William Thomas Calman 1927–1936
Martin Alister Campbell Hinton 1936–1945
Norman Boyd Kinnear 1945–1947
Hampton Wildman Parker 1947–1957
Francis Charles Fraser 1957–1964
John Philip Harding 1964–1971
John Gordon Sheals 1971–1985
John Fordyce Peake 1985–1989
Colin Robert Curds 1993–1997 (acting 1989–1993)
Philip Stephen Rainbow 1997–2013

See also
Keeper of Botany

References

Natural History Museum, London
Keeper of Zoology, Natural History Museum
Keeper of Zoology, Natural History Museum
Lists of English people